Bittium Corporation is a Finnish company headquartered in Oulu.

Bittium is an engineering company in wireless businesses. Bittium specialises in the development of secure communications and connectivity solutions.

The company's customer segments include the telecommunications, Internet of Things, and defense industries.

In August 2012, the court approved a conditional settlement agreement between EB and TerreStar Corporation and some of its preferred shareholders in the reorganization proceedings of TerreStar Corporation, based on which EB received 13.5 million US dollars in cash on August 28, 2012, as final compensation for its claims. The settlement does not apply to TerreStar Networks' ongoing Chapter 11 liquidation proceedings and does not include any distributions that may be received from those proceedings.

On 28 January 2013 Anite plc of the U.K. announced it would acquire the Elektrobit System Test Ltd. subsidiary from Elektrobit Corporation (EB), representing the Propsim portion of EB's business. The acquisition was effective 1 February 2013.

On May 19, 2015, Elektrobit announced the sale of its automotive business segment to Continental AG for US$680 million.  The sale includes the Elektrobit brand and all automotive segment assets.  Elektrobit's wireless business was renamed Bittium Corporation. The acquisition was effective 1 July 2015.

On November 10, 2016, Bittium announced the acquisition of Mega Electronics Ltd and MegaKoto Ltd, Finnish companies based in Kuopio. Mega Electronics Ltd, founded in 1983, is an ISO13485 certified medical device manufacturing company. The company is specialised in biosignal measuring for cardiology, neurology, rehabilitation, occupational health and sports medicine. MegaKoto Ltd provides arrhythmia monitoring services for its customers such as primary care centers, private clinics and hospitals.

Bittium products and services

Bittium's products are:

 Bittim Tactical Wireless IP Network,
 Bittium Tough VoIP,
 Bittium Specialised Device Platform,
 Bittium Tough Mobile,
 Bittium SafeMove.

See also
List of Finnish companies

References

Companies based in Oulu
Electronics companies of Finland
Medical technology companies of Finland
Companies listed on Nasdaq Helsinki
Technology companies established in 1985
Finnish brands
Finnish companies established in 1985